Roy Assaf (born 2 January 1979) is an Israeli actor. He appeared in more than twenty films since 2000.

Filmography
(Selective)

References

External links 

1979 births
Living people
Israeli male film actors